Emily Ruth Cross (born October 15, 1986) is a U.S. foil fencer who was a member of the 2008 Olympics U.S. Women's foil team. She is best known for helping win the team foil silver medal for the U.S. at the 2008 Beijing Olympics, along with teammates Erinn Smart and Hanna Thompson.

Born in Seattle, Washington, Cross attended the Brearley School in New York City. Her father Fred Cross, a professor in cell genetics, introduced Emily and her brother to Sam to fencing first at Metropolis Fencing Club and then at the NY Fencers Club. Her coach is Michael Petin.

She graduated from Harvard College (Bachelor of Arts in Biology) and the Perelman School of Medicine at the University of Pennsylvania, and is currently a pediatrics resident at Boston Children's Hospital.

At Harvard she was Academic All-Ivy League in 2004-05, and 2005-06.
  She was also a co-recipient of the Radcliffe Prize as Harvard's top female athlete, and as its top female scholar-athlete she received the Harvard-Radcliffe Foundation for Women's Athletics Prize.

In 2001 she won a bronze medal at the USA Fencing National Championships (Division I). She won a silver medal at the 2003 Pan American Games. In 2004, she won gold medals in both the U19 Foil and U19 Epee at the USA Fencing National Championships. In 2005, she won gold medals at the Junior World Championships, NCAA Championships (Individual; the first Harvard and fifth Ivy woman to win an NCAA fencing title), and USA Fencing National Championships (both Division I and U19). In 2006, she won gold medals at the NCAA Championships (Team) and the Junior World Championships (Team). In 2007, she won a bronze medal in the Pan American Championships. In 2008, in addition to her Olympic performance, she won a gold medal at the Pan American Championships.

Career
Cross competed in her first national tournament at age 11.

Miscellaneous
Cross has stated that her favorite person to fence is Italian foil superstar Giovanna Trillini.

References

 Cross Helps Americans to Surprise Silver
 

1986 births
Harvard Crimson fencers
Fencers at the 2008 Summer Olympics
Olympic silver medalists for the United States in fencing
Living people
American female foil fencers
Sportspeople from New York City
Medalists at the 2008 Summer Olympics
Pan American Games medalists in fencing
Pan American Games silver medalists for the United States
Brearley School alumni
Perelman School of Medicine at the University of Pennsylvania alumni
Harvard College alumni
Fencers at the 2003 Pan American Games
Medalists at the 2003 Pan American Games
21st-century American women
American sportspeople of Korean descent